Kashigaon is a town located on Ghodbunder Road in Maharashtra, India. It is now part of Thane. It has a history of rich culture and heritage consisting of different religions and castes like Bhandaris, Koli Christians, Agri, and Konkani Muslims. The town contains old temples and churches such as St. Jerome Church, Jarimari Gaondevi Mandir, Vitthal Rukmini Mandir, Gaondev Vithoba Temple, and Durga Mata Temple. The area has seen massive population growth, with many new residential and commercial projects completed in the last eight years.

Population and demographics
As of 2020, the population of Kashigaon is 12,378, consisting of 6,612 males and 5,766 females. The population density currently is 11,476 people per km²

Males and females aged 25–29 comprise most of the population, with more than 600 people in the age group, followed closely by males and females aged 20–24.

Educational Institutes

 St. Xavier's High School

Hospitals

 St. Ann's Hospital
 Wellcare hospital and Famous Gynecologist Dr deepika Asati

References 

Neighbourhoods in Thane
Villages in Thane district